Bob Holman (8 November 1936 – 15 June 2016) was an English Christian academic, author, and community campaigner in Scotland.

Born as Robert Bones, he was educated at University College London and the London School of Economics. Holman was professor of social administration at the University of Bath. He left the university and moved with his family to the Southdown council estate in Bath in 1976.

Holman was a co-founder of Family Action in Rogerfield and Easterhouse Project in Glasgow in 1989, and a member of Easterhouse Baptist Church. He moved to the estate in 1987.

Holman was a member of the Labour Party since 1961, and a  supporter of Labour leader Jeremy Corbyn. He advocated a 'yes' vote in the 2014 Scottish independence referendum.

Holman was married to Annette who was a medical social worker from Glasgow. They have a daughter, Ruth, who is a gynaecologist and a son David who is a lecturer in occupational psychology. He declined the award of an MBE in 2012 as an opponent of the monarchy, arguing the honours system was designed to promote differences of status to which he was opposed. Holman and his wife were awarded the title of Outstanding Contribution to Social Work by Community Care in November 2015.

Having recovered from Hodgkins lymphoma in 2010, Holman was diagnosed with motor neurone disease in summer 2015. He died in June 2016, aged 79.

Publications
Crime and the Responsible Community (The 1979 London Lectures in Contemporary Christianity), with Charles Colson; Norman Anderson; David McNee; and Michael Jenkins Wm.B. Eerdmans Pub. Co. 
Kids at the Door: A Preventative Project on a Council Estate, with  Wiles, Dave, and Lewis, Sandie, Blackwell Publishers, 1981, 
Putting Families First: Prevention and Child Care, Palgrave Macmillan 1988 
Good Old George: The Life of George Lansbury, Lion Books 1990, 
A New Deal for Social Welfare: A Powerful Analysis of the Contract Culture and Practical Proposals for a Way Forward, Lion Books, 1993 
Not Like Any Other Home'; Herbert White and the Children's Home and Mission, Campaign Literature, Saltcoats 1994
The Evacuation: A Very British Revolution, Lion Books, 1995
The Corporate Parent: Manchester Children's Department, 1948-71, National Institute For Social Work, 1996 
Towards Equality: A Christian Manifesto (Gospel and Cultures)SPCK Publishing,  1997 
Children and Crime, Lion Books, 1997
Fare Dealing: Neighbourhood Involvement in a Housing Scheme,  Community Development Foundation,  
Faith in the Poor, Lion Books, 1998 
Reshaping Child Care Practice, National Institute For Social Work, 1999 
Kids at the Door Revisited, Russell House Publishing Ltd., 2000
Champions for Children: The Lives of Modern Child Care Pioneers, Policy Press 2001, 
The Unknown Fostering, Russell House Publishing Ltd 2002, 
Ordinary Christians, Good News Fellowship, 2005 
F.B. Meyer: If I had a Hundred Lives, Christian Focus 2007
Keir Hardie Labour's Greatest Hero, Oxford, Lion Books, 2010. 
Woodbine Willie: An Unsung Hero of World War One, Lion Books 2013

References

External links
 Bob Holman's contributor page at The Guardian

1936 births
2016 deaths
Deaths from motor neuron disease
British social workers
Social work scholars
Academics of the University of Bath
British community activists
Academics from Glasgow